Prittlewell is an inner city area of Southend-on-Sea in the City of Southend-on-Sea, in the ceremonial county of Essex, England. Historically, Prittlewell is the original settlement of the city, Southend being the south end of Prittlewell. The village of Prittlewell was originally centered at the joining of three main roads, East Street, West Street, and North Street, which was extended south in the 19th century and renamed Victoria Avenue. The principal administrative buildings in Southend are located along Victoria Avenue, although Prittlewell is served by Prittlewell railway station.

History

Prehistoric
People first settled by the Prittle Brook at least 10,000 years ago in the late Stone Age. Little appears to have affected life in Prittlewell as its population gradually evolved from their original character as hunter-gatherers to a more settled existence during the Bronze and Iron Ages.

Roman
The Roman occupation began to influence the area with the construction of a Roman-style dwelling, probably a farmhouse or villa, close to the brook in what is now Priory Park. The introduction of new ideas, new skills and social structures under this Roman influence would have brought significant change to the area. The discovery of Roman burial sites during road and rail construction in the 1920s and 1930s indicated that the settlement was well developed and of some significance, although no prominent buildings were preserved.

Saxons and Vikings

Following the decline of Roman Britain, the area came under the influence of Saxon raiders, over time becoming established as part of the kingdom of the East Saxons. During this time (largely the 5th and 6th centuries), the historic Saxon name of Prittleuuella came into being. Part of a blocked archway built of Roman tiles survives in the north wall of the chancel of St Mary's church, and it has long been assumed that it represents part of a small Anglo-Saxon chapel built in the 7th century, possibly as early as the reign of King Sæberht of Essex. However, more recent study and comparison with surviving architectural remains elsewhere suggest instead that the arch may date as late as the 10th or early 11th century, and that this is the date of the first church to be built on the site.

Royal Saxon tomb

The construction works of 1923 and 1930 that revealed Roman burials also unearthed evidence of numerous Anglo-Saxon burials, a significant number of which were high-status or warrior burials containing weapons, imported goods, jewellery and decorative beads, some of which were made out of glass. The high status of the area during the Anglo-Saxon period was confirmed by the discovery of a substantial and undisturbed 7th-century chamber tomb in 2003. The burial site was uncovered by archaeologists from Museum of London Archaeology, who had been commissioned to prepare the site in advance of a road widening scheme. In 2009, following local opposition, the scheme was dropped and the traffic congestion eased by works to a different road location.

The unusually rich contents and their condition have excited archaeologists, being described as "unique" by the Museum of London. A fuller description of the excavation and the artefacts of the burial chamber, thought to be of Sæberht of Essex, can be seen at the dedicated Museum of London website. The story of the excavation was also thought so significant as to be the subject of a special documentary titled "King of Bling", as part of the Time Team series.

Medieval
At the time of the Domesday Survey in 1086, the two manors in the area that is now Prittlewell were Prittlewell and Milton, the former owned by Swein of Essex and the latter by the Priory of Holy Trinity, Canterbury (now Canterbury Cathedral). In the 12th century, Robert de Essex, also known as Robert FitzSwein, founded Prittlewell Priory as a cell of the Cluniac Priory of St Pancras, Lewes. The foundation charter included the manor and church of Prittlewell. At this time, the lands of the priory extended to the seafront. Due to this, when a fishing settlement was set up two miles (3 km) south of the priory in the 14th century, it was still regarded as part of Prittlewell and as such was named Stratende, Sowthende or South-End. From this settlement, the modern town of Southend-on-Sea grew. Over a period of around two hundred years, the Parish Church, St. Mary's, was substantially enlarged, reaching its present size with the addition of its tower in the mid-15th century. At the time of the Tudor Dissolution of the Monasteries by Henry VIII, the priory, which had by this time developed into a sprawling complex, was closed and the lands seized by the crown.

19th century

Southend was developed as a bathing resort in the 18th century, and by the 19th, Prittlewell was regarded by visitors to Southend as "an attractive village in the hinterland". In 1848, Prittlewell was described in the White's Directory of Essex as "a neat and well built village with many modern houses overlooking the estuary of the Thames, 1½ miles North West of Southend, and 3 miles South of Rochford". Links between Prittlewell and Southend were improved in 1889 when a road, named Victoria Avenue, was built between the village crossroads by the church to Southend and in 1892 when Prittlewell railway station was built on the Great Eastern Railway, linking Southend and London. 1892 also saw the foundation of the Municipal Borough of Southend-on-Sea, which took over responsibility for Prittlewell from an earlier local board.

20th century
The old priory, which had been in ownership of the Scratton family, was bought by local jeweller and benefactor R. A. Jones and was given to the people of Southend as Priory Park. In 1901, Eric Kingham Cole was born in Prittlewell and went on to form EKCO, a radio, TV and plastic manufacturer, in 1924. In 1930, he built a large factory opposite Priory Park, but by 1966 the electrical side of the factory was closed (except for the car radio repair department, which closed in 1977). The Access (credit card) business moved into the factory in 1972, but with the business changing in the 1990s, Royal Bank of Scotland moved out, leaving the EKCO (now Linpac) plastic factory the only operative on the site. This closed down in 2007, and the whole site was demolished in 2012, with a combined housing and commercial development (and a new Havens Hospice) being given planning permission on 14 January 2015.

On 9 November 1913 the parish was abolished to form "Southend on Sea".

Geography
Modern-day Prittlewell stretches from the crossroads by St Mary's Church to London Southend Airport on the boundary between Southend and Rochford.

Demography 

At the 2001 UK census, the Prittlewell electoral ward had a population of 9,478. The ethnicity was 95.1% white, 1% mixed race, 2.8% Asian, 0.5% black and 0.6% other. The place of birth of residents was 93.9% United Kingdom, 0.8% Republic of Ireland, 1.2% other Western European countries, and 4.1% elsewhere. Religion was recorded as 71.2% Christian, 0.3% Buddhist, 1.2% Hindu, 0% Sikh, 1.1% Jewish, and 1.7% Muslim. 16.2% were recorded as having no religion, 0.3% had an alternative religion and 8.0% did not state their religion.

The economic activity of residents aged 16–74 was 39.5% in full-time employment, 12.6% in part-time employment, 9.6% self-employed, 3.3% unemployed, 2.3% students with jobs, 2.9% students without jobs, 16.5% retired, 6.3% looking after home or family, 4.5% permanently sick or disabled and 2.6% economically inactive for other reasons. The industry of employment of residents was 15.8% retail, 11% manufacturing, 8.1% construction, 11.6% real estate, 12.9% health and social work, 7% education, 6.2% transport and communications, 6.7% public administration, 2.8% hotels and restaurants, 11.7% finance, 0.7% agriculture and 5.5% other. Compared with national figures, the ward had a relatively high proportion of workers in finance and health and social work. Of the ward's residents aged 16–74, 14.4% had a higher education qualification or the equivalent, compared with 19.9% nationwide. According to Office for National Statistics estimates, during the period of April 2004 to March 2005 the average gross weekly income of households was £590, compared with an average of £650 in South East England.

Landmarks
Only a small proportion of the historical village of Prittlewell remains standing; the ruins and standing remains of the Priory, visible in Priory Park; St. Mary's Church; A building recently restored following fire damage, though more recently a bakery, now an estate agent appropriately named Tudor Estates; as well as a number of public houses, the most famous of which is the Blue Boar. This is famous as being where Southend United F.C. were formed, however the building that currently stands there is of Victorian construction, as the original building was destroyed by fire. Since 1955, Prittlewell has been the home to Southend United F.C. at their ground Roots Hall, and has been since the 1960s home to a weekly market which takes place on a Thursday. Southend are planning to move from this location, and Sainsbury's currently have planning permission to build a supermarket on the site of Roots Hall, St Mary's flats, the former Eastern National Bus Garage/former Prospects College and the shops on the corner of Victoria Avenue and Fairfax Drive.

Transport
The area is served by Prittlewell railway station on the Shenfield–Southend line.

Sports
Prittlewell is home to football teams Ekco Whitecaps and Prittlewell Badgers.

Gallery

References

Further reading

External links

 "A Brief History of Southend"
 Museum of London, "Treasures of a Saxon King of Essex"
 (Museum of London Archaeological Services) The "Prittlewell Prince" The undisturbed 7th-century Saxon burial chamber.

Towns in Essex
Former civil parishes in Essex
Southend-on-Sea (town)